Igor Vušurović (born 24 September 1974) is a former Montenegrin volleyball player, who won the gold medal with the Yugoslav Men's National Team at the 2000 Summer Olympics.

References

 

1974 births
Living people
Montenegrin men's volleyball players
Yugoslav men's volleyball players
Olympic volleyball players of Yugoslavia
Olympic gold medalists for Federal Republic of Yugoslavia
Volleyball players at the 2000 Summer Olympics
Place of birth missing (living people)
Olympic medalists in volleyball
European champions for Serbia and Montenegro
Medalists at the 2000 Summer Olympics